Space (Hyperspace in the United States) is a 2001 BBC documentary which ran for six episodes covering a number of topics in relation to outer space. The series is hosted and narrated by actor Sam Neill.

Episodes

DVD releases
The series was released on region 2 DVD in 2001 by BBC Video.
In 2002, the series was released in the United States on region 1 DVD (under the alternate title Hyperspace), also by BBC Video.

External links
 

Hyperspace (Space) DVD on Internet Archive

BBC television documentaries
Documentary films about outer space
2001 British television series debuts
2001 British television series endings
BBC television documentaries about science
Astronomy education television series